The NAB Broadcasting Hall of Fame is a yearly honor from the National Association of Broadcasters.  One inductee from radio and one from television are named at the yearly NAB conference.

Radio
For a list of award winners, see footnote

 1977: Jack Benny, Fred Allen, Lowell Thomas, Edward R. Murrow, Milton Cross, David Sarnoff, Ted Husing, Edwin Armstrong, Herbert Hoover, Gene Autry, Freeman Gosden, Charles Correll, Bob Hope, Graham McNamee
 1978: Arthur Godfrey, Jim Jordan, Marian Jordan, Walter Winchell, Guglielmo Marconi
 1979: Paul Harvey, Orson Welles
 1980: Bing Crosby, George Burns
 1981: Ronald Reagan, Kate Smith
 1982: Edgar Bergen, Don McNeill
 1983: Chester Lauck, Norris Goff, Benny Goodman
 1984: Red Skelton, Bob Elliot, Ray Goulding
 1985: Casey Kasem, Fred Palmer
 1986: Mel Allen, Earl Nightingale
 1987: Robert Trout, Gordon McLendon, Todd Storz
 1988: Roy Acuff, William B. Williams
 1989: Red Barber, Nathan Safir
 1990: Charles Osgood, Hal Jackson
 1991: Douglas Edwards
 1992: Larry King
 1993: Grand Ole Opry
 1994: Harry Caray
 1995: Gary Owens
 1996: Don Imus
 1997: Wally Phillips
 1998: Rush Limbaugh
 1999: Wolfman Jack
 2000: Tom Joyner
 2001: Bruce Morrow
 2002: Dick Orkin
 2003: Scott Shannon
 2004: Mormon Tabernacle Choir, Music and the Spoken Word
 2005: Jack Buck
 2006: Dick Purtan
 2007: Rick Dees
 2008: Larry Lujack
 2009: Vin Scully
 2010: Ron Chapman
 2011: Gerry House
 2012: Bob Uecker
 2013: Dave Ramsey
 2014: Steve Harvey
 2015: Kevin and Bean
 2016: Mike & Mike (Mike Greenberg and Mike Golic) 
 2017: Delilah
 2018: Elvis Duran
 2019: Cathy Hughes
 2020: John Records Landecker
 2021: All Things Considered

Television
For list of award winners, see footnote

 1977: William S. Paley
 1988: Lucille Ball and Milton Berle
 1989: Sid Caesar and Ernie Kovacs
 1990: The Honeymooners, Sylvester L. Weaver
 1991: Jerry Lewis
 1992: Star Trek
 1993: 60 Minutes
 1994: Roone Arledge
 1995: Carol Burnett
 1996: M*A*S*H
 1997: The Today Show
 1998: Bob Keeshan
 1999: All in the Family
 2000: Saturday Night Live
 2001: Ted Koppel
 2002: Rowan and Martin's Laugh-In
 2003: The Wonderful World of Disney
 2004: Roger King
 2005: The Tonight Show with Jay Leno
 2006: Regis Philbin
 2007: Meet the Press
 2008: Bob Barker
 2009: Bob Newhart
 2010: NBC Sports
 2011: Carsey Werner Company
 2012: Garry Marshall, Betty White
 2013: American Idol
 2014: Everybody Loves Raymond
 2015: Shonda Rhimes
 2016: Chuck Lorre
 2017: María Elena Salinas
 2018: Wheel of Fortune and Jeopardy!
 2019: Fox NFL Sunday
 2020: America's Funniest Home Videos
 2021:  Lester Holt
 2022:  The Price Is Right

See also
Television Hall of Fame
National Radio Hall of Fame
National Sports Media Association Hall of Fame (including sportscasters)

References

External links
NAB Broadcasting Hall of Fame

Mass media museums in the United States
Science and technology halls of fame
Broadcasters
Awards established in 1977
Hall of Fame
1977 establishments in Washington, D.C.